Amy Keating Rogers (born June 17, 1969) is an American television writer who has contributed to several notable animated television series and films, including episodes of The Powerpuff Girls and My Little Pony: Friendship Is Magic. She has been nominated for four Primetime Emmy Awards. In 2009, Rogers directed the documentary film Jason Bateman Thinks I'm Dead, which chronicles her attempts to re-establish contact with actor Jason Bateman, one of her classmates in elementary school. On April 27, 2015, she became a full-time writer at Disney.

Personal life
Rogers has a husband Aaron, with whom she has two children, Moira and Soren Rogers.

Filmography
 #TweetIt: Featuring My Little Pony Staff and Bronies (2014)
 PAW Patrol (2013) (TV) (guest writer)
 Bronies: The Extremely Unexpected Adult Fans of My Little Pony (2013) (herself)
 Care Bears: Welcome to Care-a-Lot (2012) (TV) (story editor)
 My Little Pony: Friendship Is Magic (2010–2012; 2014–2015) (TV) (writer)
 The Fairly OddParents (2008-2009) (TV) (story) (writer)
 Danny Phantom (2007) (TV) (writer, "D-Stabilized")
 My Life as a Teenage Robot (2005) (TV) (writer)
 Foster's Home for Imaginary Friends (2004-2005) (TV) (story) (writer)
 The Powerpuff Girls: 'Twas The Fight Before Christmas (2003) (outline editor)
 The Powerpuff Girls Movie (2002) (story)
 Samurai Jack (2001-2004) (TV) (outline editor)
 Grim & Evil (2001) (TV) (writer)
 Dexter's Laboratory: Ego Trip (1999) (story)
 The Powerpuff Girls (1998-2004) (TV) (story) (outline editor) (writer) (head writer) (production coordinator)
 Johnny Bravo (1997-2004) (TV) (writer: story) (unit production assistant)
 Dexter's Laboratory (1996) (TV) (story)

References

External links
 
 

1969 births
20th-century American screenwriters
21st-century American screenwriters
20th-century American women writers
21st-century American women writers
Television producers from California
American women television producers
American television writers
Living people
American women screenwriters
American women television writers
American storyboard artists
Screenwriters from California
Writers from Los Angeles